The Naked Brothers Band: Music from the Movie is an EP/soundtrack by The Naked Brothers Band for The Naked Brothers Band: The Movie. It was released as an extra disc on the Naked Brothers Band Movie DVD. The disc was only available with the DVD for a short time only and now is only available to buy on Amazon. It was not an official release and has not yet been released separately, or on The iTunes Store. The first single "Crazy Car" charted on the Billboard Hot 100 in 2007 at No. 83.

Background

Development
Nat begged his dad to record music in the recording studio at the early age of 6. His father, Michael Wolff allowed him to, so Nat recorded the song Crazy Car. Polly Draper (Nat & Alex's mom), then wrote a film about her son's band The Naked Brothers Band. Along with the film she wanted her sons to record songs, as if it they were recording a soundtrack for the film.

Writing
Nat Wolff began writing music for the film in late 2004, having already written and recorded "Crazy Car" he had to write very few songs. He wrote "Got No Mojo", "Motormouth", "Hardcore Wrestlers" and "If There Was a Place to Hide".

Recording
Recording began in early 2005, when Nat was just 9 years old. He recorded all of the music he wrote for him, his brother Alex was also able to write a song for the film, That's How It Is. The music was recorded by June 2005, just before filming began on The Naked Brothers Band Movie.

Release
The songs were meant to be released on a soundtrack for the movie, called: The Naked Brothers Band: Music from the Movie in 2006, but due to the project being developed into a television series instead, the soundtrack was unreleased.

The music was instead released on an extra disc that came with the DVD of the movie, that was released on April 3, 2007. The album only included 5 songs from the film, and was only available for a short time.

Track listing
The Naked Brothers Band: Music from the Movie includes the following tracks.

Charting
Due to the album being released as an extra disc to the film's DVD, it was not eligible to chart. However, the first single from the album "Crazy Car" charted in 2007, it peaked at No. 83 on the Billboard Hot 100.

Limited Release
Due to it being an extra disc on The Naked Brothers Band: The Movie DVD, it was only available for a limited time only, as of 2010 the extra disc is no longer available in the United States.

References

External links
 Visit Website!
 Watch Episodes!

2007 soundtrack albums
Pop rock soundtracks
Columbia Records soundtracks
Musical film soundtracks
Comedy film soundtracks